The term "National Treasure" has been used in Japan to denote cultural properties since 1897,
although the definition and the criteria have changed since the introduction of the term. The written materials in the list adhere to the current definition, and have been designated National Treasures according to the Law for the Protection of Cultural Properties that came into effect on June 9, 1951. The items are selected by the Ministry of Education, Culture, Sports, Science and Technology based on their "especially high historical or artistic value". The list presents 105 entries from the Western Wei dynasty to the Meiji period with most dating to the period of Classical Japan and Mid-Imperial China from the 7th to 14th century. The total number of items is higher, however, since groups of related objects have been joined as single entries.

The list contains various types of written materials such as sutra copies, Buddhist commentaries and teachings, poetry and letters. Some of the designated objects originated in China, and were imported at a time when writing was being introduced to Japan. The items in this list were predominantly made with a writing brush on manuscript scrolls, which was the preferred medium until the advent of commercial printing and publishing in the 17th century. In many cases the manuscripts are noted examples of calligraphy. They are housed in temples, museums, libraries or archives, shrines, universities and in private collections. The writings in this list represent about half of the 232 National Treasures in the category "writings". They are complemented by 70 Japanese and 57 Chinese book National Treasures of the List of National Treasures of Japan (writings: Japanese books) and the List of National Treasures of Japan (writings: Chinese books).

Statistics

Usage
The table's columns (except for Remarks and Image) are sortable pressing the arrows symbols. The following gives an overview of what is included in the table and how the sorting works.
Name: the name as registered in the Database of National Cultural Properties
Authors: name of the author(s)
Remarks: information about the type of document and its content
Date: period and year; The column entries sort by year. If only a period is known, they sort by the start year of that period.
Format: principal type, technique and dimensions; The column entries sort by the main type: scroll (includes handscrolls and letters), book (includes albums, ordinary bound books and books bound by fukuro-toji) and other (includes hanging scrolls)
Present location: "temple/museum/shrine-name town-name prefecture-name"; The column entries sort as "prefecture-name town-name".
Image: picture of the manuscript or of a characteristic document in a group of manuscripts

Treasures

Buddhist writings

Sutras
The concept of writing came to Japan from the Korean kingdom of Baekje in the form of classical Chinese books and sutras, likely written on paper and in the form of manuscript rolls (kansubon). This probably happened at the beginning of the 5th century (around 400), and certainly in conjunction with the introduction of Buddhism in the 6th century. The increasing popularity of Buddhism, strongly promoted by Prince Shōtoku (574–622), in the late-6th century and early-7th century was one of the factors leading to a rise in the importance of writing. Buddhism required the study of sutras in Chinese. To satisfy the growing demand for them, imported Sui and Tang manuscripts were copied, first by Korean and Chinese immigrants, and later in the mid-7th century by Japanese scribes. The Sangyō Gisho ("Annotated Commentaries on the Three Sutras"), traditionally attributed to Prince Shōtoku, is the oldest extant Japanese text of any length. By 673 the entire Buddhist canon had been systematically copied. Not a single sutra survives from before the end of the 6th century. The oldest extant complete sutra copied in Japan dates to 686 and has been designated a National Treasure. During the 7th and 8th centuries, the copying of Buddhist texts, including sutras, dominated writing. Few Chinese secular or local Japanese works (which were rare) were copied. The state founded a Sutra Copying Bureau (shakyōjo) before 727 with highly specialized calligraphers, proofreaders and metal polishers to satisfy the large demand for Buddhist texts. 
Sutra copying was not only for duplication but also to acquire religious merit; thus nearly all Buddhist texts were hand-copied during the 8th century despite knowledge of printing.

The peak of sutra copying occurred in the Nara period at which time the Great Perfection of Wisdom (Daihannya) sutra and the Lotus Sutra were the sutras most often copied. Most of the sutras were written in black ink on paper dyed pale yellow. However, some were made with gold or silver ink on indigo, purple or other colored paper—particularly the ones that were produced in 741 when Emperor Shōmu decreed Konkōmyō Saishōō sutras written in gold letters be distributed among provincial temples. Many sutra copies contain a colophon with the name of the sponsor—often somebody from the ruling class—and the reason of copying, usually related to the health or salvation of people or the state.

After the shakyōjo closed at the end of the 8th century, the imperial family and leading aristocrats continued to sponsor sutra copying. Because of an enhanced belief in the powers of the Lotus Sutra, more Heian period copies of this sutra exist than of all other sutras combined. Starting in the early Heian period, styles became flowery and ornate with lavish decorations as sutras were not used only in recitation but for dedication and sacrifice. Devotional sutra copying was more often undertaken by the initiator than in the Nara period. New forms of decoration came in fashion by the early-11th century including placing each character in the outline of a stupa, on lotus pedestals or next to depictions of Boddhisattvas. Sutras were increasingly furnished with frontispieces starting in the 11th century. Calligraphy shifted from Chinese to Japanese style. Sutra copying continued into the Kamakura and subsequent periods, but only rarely to comparable artistic effect. With the import of printed Song editions in the Kamakura period, hand-copying of the complete scriptures died out and sutra copying was only practiced for its devotional aspect. Forty-seven sutras or sets of sutras from the 6th century Western Wei to 14th century Nanboku-chō period have been designated National Treasures. Some of the oldest items in this list originated in China.

Treatises, commentaries
Nara period Buddhism was dominated by six state-controlled sects. They were introduced from the mainland and centred around the ancient capitals in Asuka and Nara. These schools were generally academic in nature, closely connected with the court and represented a doctrine that was far removed from the daily life of the people. In 804, two Japanese monks Kūkai and Saichō travelled to China; on their return they established Tendai and Shingon Buddhism respectively. Unlike their predecessors both esoteric schools took into account the needs of the common people. Though their origins lay in China, with time they acquired local Japanese traits. Generally the 9th century was a time when Chinese learning thrived in Japan. Authors produced a wide variety of works in Chinese language, including commentaries and treatises on a variety of subjects.

A number of new sects appeared in Japan in the 12th and 13th centuries as a natural reaction to the difficult teachings of older schools and partially motivated by the notion of mappō. Growing out of an Amida cult, the Jōdo Shinshū Pure Land school was founded in 1224 by Shinran, and attracted a following from all classes and occupations. Three years later, Dōgen introduced the Sōtō school of Zen Buddhism emphasizing meditation and dharma practice. The first truly Japanese school of Buddhism goes back to Nichiren's proclamation of his teachings in 1253. Nichiren Buddhism was exceptional for being militant and intolerant. The central focus of Nichiren's teaching was the veneration of the Lotus Sutra.

Fourteen treatises and commentaries of famous Japanese monks dating from the early Heian to the Kamakura period have been designated as National Treasures. These include three commentaries by Kūkai on two of the main mantras (Dainichikyō and Kongōhannyakyō) of Shingon Buddhism, works by Shinran discussing Pure Land Buddhism, mappō and Amida, a manual on zazen "seated meditation" by Dōgen and two works by Nichiren related to his teachings. In addition two large scale collection of documents from the Nara to the Meiji period are listed here as National Treasures.

Zen monk writings, bokuseki
Bokuseki is a type of Japanese calligraphy practiced by Zen monks or lay practitioners of Zen meditation. Characterised by freely written bold characters, the style often ignores criteria and classical standards for calligraphy. The brush is moved continuously across the paper creating richly variated lines. Unlike other calligraphy, bokuseki is considered "religious art"—a manifestation of the artist's understanding of the Dharma. In this sense, the literal meaning of the word "bokuseki", translated as "ink trace", indicates the piece is considered to be a trace of the enlightened mind.

The bokuseki style developed from Song Dynasty calligraphy. It was brought from China to Japan, together with Zen Buddhism, starting with Eisai in 1191. Late-12th century works imported from China were highly regarded in Japan; subsequently Japanese priests began producing their own bokuseki in the 13th and 14th centuries. Later bokuseki became part of the zen practice and served as meditation help. They were often mounted on hanging scrolls, and displayed in temples and tea rooms. The master of the Japanese tea ceremony Sen no Rikyū considered them crucial to the tea ceremony in the sense that they put the participants in the right frame-of-mind. Bokuseki gained in importance through the chanoyu in the Muromachi and Momoyama periods. Daitō Kokushi and Musō Soseki, both from the Rinzai school of Zen Buddhism, were the most famous bokuseki masters of the time.

The bokuseki style is present in a variety of Zen genres such as Buddhist sermons or Dharma talks (hōgo), certificates of enlightenment (inkajō), death verses (yuige), gatha verses (geju), poetry (shi), letters, names and titles given to a monk by his master (jigo), exhortory sermons (shidōgo), gakuji, inscriptions on Zen paintings (san) and Zen circles. There are 23 bokuseki National Treasures of various types including inkajō, hōgo, letters and yuige. They date from the 12th to 14th centuries and have been mounted on hanging scrolls.

Kaishi or futokorogami
Kaishi, or futokorogami, were sheets of paper carried by high-ranking people folded in their kimonos at the breast. They were used for writing letters, or waka; similar sheets were employed during the tea ceremony. Papers came in a variety of sizes and colours, depending on the rank and sex of those using them. At court men wrote on white paper, while women wrote only on red kaishi paper. The folding style, labelling, and other stylistic features, differed from school to school. Four items from the Heian and Kamakura periods have been designated as National Treasures in the kaishi category. They are single sheets or sets of sheets mounted on hanging scrolls or bound in an album and contain poetry by Japanese rulers and famous poets.

Albums of exemplary calligraphy, tekagami
Collections of exemplary calligraphy, or tekagami (lit. "mirror of the hands"), were created by cutting pages and sections of old books and scrolls of sutras, poems and letters, which were arranged in albums in a chronological order or according to social status. By the early-16th century, calligraphic connoisseurs of the Kohitsu house had practiced activities aimed at preserving ancient calligraphic works. Tekagami production appears to have started in the Momoyama period. These albums served as model books for calligraphy practice, the emulation of old styles, and as reference works for authentication in the growing antique market. Today, the selection of calligraphers, and the type of calligraphies in a tekagami, show the changing tastes in classical Japanese-style calligraphy over the years. Four tekagami containing works from the 8th century Nara to the 15th century Muromachi period have been designated as National Treasures.

Ancient calligraphy, kohitsu
In Japanese calligraphy the term  originally referred to works by ancient calligraphers, or poets, on scrolls or bound books, created from between the 8th to 15th centuries. In today's use, the term mainly describes copies of poetry anthologies from the Heian to mid-Kamakura period. Since they were made as artful daily items for the nobility, in addition to having a beautiful script, attention was given to the choice of paper (which was often decorated), the binding, mountings and even accompanying boxes. Stylistically, kohitsu were written in Japanese kana in cursive script (sōgana). In the Momoyama and early Edo period, surviving kohitsu were often cut (kohitsu-gire), mounted on hanging scrolls and displayed in a tea room. Six scrolls of kohitsu poetry collections from the mid-Heian period have been designated as National Treasures. They were made by two calligraphers: Fujiwara no Yukinari and Ono no Michikaze.

Others
There are three National Treasures writings that do not fit in any of the above categories, all originating in China. Two are 7th century works: a copy of the Thousand Character Classic by Zhi Yong both in formal and cursive scripts, and a tracing copy of a letter by the famous Chinese calligrapher Wang Xizhi. The former work is said to have been imported to Japan by the legendary scholar Wani in ancient times. One is a 13th-century set of large-scale letters (2 or 3 each) to be displayed on walls or above doorways.

See also
List of Japanese poetry anthologies
List of Japanese classic texts
Nara Research Institute for Cultural Properties
Tokyo Research Institute for Cultural Properties
Independent Administrative Institution National Museum

Notes

References

Bibliography

Writings
Written communication
Japanese literature
Japanese literature in Classical Chinese
Sutra literature
Chinese literature